Manchester Curious is an event which promotes appreciation of architecture in Manchester by the general public. It is inspired by similar Open-City events and first appeared in Manchester in October 2015.  Heritage Open Days is a similar event covering the rest of England, and takes place the previous month to Manchester Curious.

The Manchester Curious is usually held in early October. 2016 will see the second event building upon the original 28 events available in 2015.

Manchester Curious differs to other open house events as it charges a nominal fee for each event, rather than providing a brochure that gives access (as in London).

See also
 Historic Houses Association
 Open House London
 Doors Open Days
 Treasure Houses of England

References

External links
Manchester Curious Homepage

Doors Open Days
Recurring events established in 2015
Events in Manchester